Domariaganj is a town and tehsil of Siddharthnagar district in eastern Uttar Pradesh. It is located on the bank of the river Rapti, 30 km south of the Nepal border.

Geography

Administration
Domariyaganj Lok Sabha constituency is one of the 80 Lok Sabha (parliamentary) constituencies in Uttar Pradesh.

See also
 Domariaganj (Lok Sabha constituency)
 Hallaur
 Wasa Dargah

References

External links
Domariaganj website
Our Village India
Bharat Bhari

Cities and towns in Siddharthnagar district